Rumble Doll is the debut full-length album from singer-songwriter Patti Scialfa.  It features twelve tracks, eleven by Scialfa and one co-written with Mike Campbell. It also features a number of guest stars in production and playing roles, namely Mike Campbell and Bruce Springsteen, as well as; Kenny Aronoff, Jim Keltner, Nils Lofgren, Jeff Porcaro and Benmont Tench.

Allmusic's Tim Griggs gave the record 3 of 5 stars, and called it "a slow seduction".  He called the title track "a gem", and praised the production, which he called "low-key compared to 60's girl singers produced by Phil Spector."

Track listing

Production 

Produced By Mike Campbell & Bruce Springsteen
Engineers: Mike Campbell, Rob Jaczko, Dennis Kirk, Mark Linett
Assistant Engineers: Martin Brumbach, Greg Goldman, Brandon Harris, David Knight, Tom Nellen, Mike Piersante, Richard Plank, Chuck Plotkin, Brian Soucy, Gabriel Sutter, Randy Wine
Mixing: Bob Clearmountain
Mastering: Stephen Marcussen

Personnel
Bass: Mike Campbell (tracks 3–5, 7–10)
Drums: Zachary Alford (track 5), Kenny Aronoff (track 8), Jim Keltner (track 10), Russ Kunkel (track 7), Gary Mallaber (tracks 1, 4, 6, 9, 12), Jeff Porcaro (tracks 2, 11)
Drum Programming: Mike Campbell (track 3), Patti Scialfa (track 3)
Guitars: Mike Campbell (tracks 1–12), Nils Lofgren (track 4), Tim Pierce (track 11), Bruce Springsteen (tracks 6, 11)
Keyboards: Roy Bittan (tracks 4, 7, 12), Patti Scialfa (tracks 1–4, 9–10, 12), Bruce Springsteen (tracks 6, 11), Benmont Tench (tracks 5, 7)
Bass keyboard: Cliff Carter (track 2)
Percussion: Zachary Alford (track 5), Kenny Aronoff (track 8), Bobbye Hall (tracks 1, 6, 12), Rob Jaczko (track 7), Jim Keltner (track 10), Gary Mallaber (tracks 3–4, 9), Jeff Porcaro (tracks 2, 11)
Violin: Soozie Tyrell (track 1)
Vocals, lead: Patti Scialfa (tracks 1–12)
Vocals, backing: Lisa Lowell (tracks 1, 3), Patti Scialfa (tracks 1, 3), Soozie Tyrell (tracks 1, 3)

References

Patti Scialfa, "Rumble Doll" CD Liner Notes; 1993, Columbia Records

1993 debut albums
Columbia Records albums
Patti Scialfa albums